Christopher Coghill (born 11 April 1975) is an English actor, having had roles in Shameless, Burn It, Hotel Babylon, The Bill, New Tricks, Doctors, Holby City, Heartbeat, Secret Diary of a Call Girl, Waterloo Road and Cold Feet, and as Tony King in EastEnders.

Career
Coghill has appeared in many television programmes such as HolbyBlue, Shameless, Burn It, Hotel Babylon, The Bill, New Tricks, Doctors, Holby City, Heartbeat, Secret Diary of a Call Girl, Waterloo Road and Cold Feet. He has also appeared in films such as Someone Else, The Banker, Molly's Idle Ways, Slide and 24 Hour Party People. 

In 2008, Coghill was cast in EastEnders in the controversial role of Tony King, Bianca Jackson's boyfriend. Over the course of three months, it emerged that the character had been having a relationship with Bianca's stepdaughter Whitney Dean for three years, starting when Whitney was just 12-years old, and was also seen 'grooming' Lauren Branning. The storyline ended in December 2008 when Whitney told Bianca, who then told the police, and Tony was arrested, thus ending Coghill's three-month stint in the show. Coghill reprised the role for the character's trial, which was screened in December 2009. After leaving EastEnders, Coghill noted that his storyline in the show had affected his career and was finding it more difficult to find roles. Coghill next appeared as ambulance driver Bobby Sheridan in the medical drama series The Royal, in 2008. 

In 2016, Coghill appeared in BBC One drama series Moving On. He appeared in series 4 of Line of Duty on BBC One in 2017.

Personal life
Coghill married actress Lisa Faulkner in April 2005, having met her on the set of Burn It. Their wedding was held at Pembroke Lodge, in Richmond Park, London, and they honeymooned in Malaysia. The couple have an adopted daughter. They separated in 2011.

Awards and nominations
2003 Royal Television Society North West Awards, Best Performance in a Network Drama, for Burn It
2003 British Academy Television Award for Best New Writer, for Clocking Off
2009 British Soap Awards for Villain of the Year, for Tony King (EastEnders)

Filmography

Films

TV

References

External links
 

People from Prestwich
1975 births
Living people
English male film actors
English male television actors